Mona Penelope Simpson is a fictional guest character in the animated television series The Simpsons. She is voiced most prominently by Glenn Close, but has also been voiced by Maggie Roswell, Tress MacNeille, and Pamela Hayden. Close's performances as Mona have been well received by critics and she was named one of the top 25 guest stars on the show by IGN.

Mona was the estranged wife of Abe Simpson, the mother-in-law of Marge Simpson, and the mother of Homer Simpson. In the episode "Mother Simpson", it was established that Homer believed that his mother was dead, a lie his father, Abe, told him when in reality she was on the run from the law after she sabotaged Mr Burns's biological warfare laboratory. Mona first appeared in the second season in a flashback in "Oh Brother, Where Art Thou?". She returned in the seventh season for her first main appearance in "Mother Simpson" and also had a large role in "My Mother the Carjacker". The character appeared again in Season 19's "Mona Leaves-a", but died during the episode. An Inception-inspired dream version of her appears in season 23's "How I Wet Your Mother". In the episode "Let's Go Fly a Coot", she is revealed to have met Abe when she was a waitress in a cantina and he broke the sound barrier to impress her.

The character is named after writer Richard Appel's ex-wife, the American novelist (and Steve Jobs's biological sister) Mona Simpson. The inspiration for the character is Bernardine Dohrn of the Weather Underground.

Biography

Few pieces of Mona's life story have been revealed. She was first mentioned in season one and made two brief flashback appearances, but her first major appearance was in "Mother Simpson". In the episode, it is revealed that in the 1960s, Mona was a homemaker who lived with her husband Abraham Simpson and Homer, who at the time was a child. She became caught up in the hippie movement after her beliefs were ignited by seeing Joe Namath's long hair during Super Bowl III.

Mona soon became a political activist and, at one event, Mona and a group of other activists protesting germ research entered Montgomery Burns's laboratory and destroyed all the biological warfare experiments. As the gang escaped, she stayed behind to help a fallen Burns, who in turn, swore to have her thrown in jail for the rest of her life. Since that night, Mona was forced to leave her family and run off with a jester. Abe lied and said Mona had died while Homer was at the movies, to spare him of the trauma that his mother was a wanted criminal. For 27 years, Homer presumed that his mother was dead. He was accidentally reunited with Mona in "Mother Simpson" after he faked his own death to get a day off from work and Mona visited his supposed gravesite. Overjoyed at their reunion, he brings Mona home to meet his family. At first, Mona does not reveal her whereabouts and spends time catching up with her family, but is forced to reveal her past. She later travels to the post office with Homer, where Mr. Burns recognizes her face and tracks her down with FBI assistance. However, a tip-off to Homer from Chief Wiggum allows Mona to escape. Wiggum is grateful to Mona because his asthma was cured by the "antibiotic bomb" her group detonated during their lab infiltration, thereby allowing him to join the police force. Forced to go on the run again, Mona tells Homer she loves him and escapes to the underground.

In "D'oh-in' in the Wind", it is revealed that at some point, Mona spent time at a commune with two hippies, Seth and Munchie, after life with Abraham became unbearable. It is also strongly implied that she was unfaithful to Abraham. In the episode "Homer's Paternity Coot", a long lost letter reveals that Mona had an affair with lifeguard Mason Fairbanks, leading Homer to falsely believe that he might, in fact, be his real father.

In "My Mother the Carjacker", Homer discovers a secret message left for him in a newspaper that tells him to go to a location. There Homer finds Mona, who explains she had to return after she saw a macaroni pencil holder Homer made for her when he was five. She is captured by police and put on trial for the crime she committed. Due to Homer's heartfelt testimony, she is acquitted. Mr. Burns is angered by this and has her imprisoned for the minor charge of signing into a national park under a false name (Anita Bonghit). As she is being transported to jail, Homer attempts to break her free from the prison bus, but the chase ends in what appears to be her death when the bus drives off a cliff and lands in the water, where it explodes and sets off a rock avalanche which buries it. In truth, she narrowly escaped before the bus went off the cliff, and is still on the run.

Mona returns in "Mona Leaves-a" to try to make up for lost time with Homer, but he angrily refuses, saying that she will just abandon him again. Homer feels guilty about being angry with her and tries to make up only to learn she has died. Then Homer feels very guilty and Homer does something she asked for. She is cremated and, according to her will, Homer is supposed to throw her ashes on a mountain, where they disrupt a missile guidance system which would have devastated the Amazon Rainforest, once again plotted by Burns. Although disappointed that the last thing his mother asked him to do was "another hippie protest", Homer successfully stops the launch and accidentally causes an explosion that destroys the launch site, representing Mona's final victory, through her family and over all the things she spent her life fighting for. Reassured by Lisa that Mona will live on forever through his heroics, Homer releases his mother's ashes once more.

Mona briefly returns in "How I Wet Your Mother", where she rescues the family in a dream of Homer's, saying that she lives on in his dreams. It is revealed in this episode that a couple of weeks before she left Homer as a child, Homer and Grampa went on a fishing trip that was unsuccessful as the boat capsized. Homer would later feel guilt, believing that the incident prompted Mona to leave him and his father. Mona solves Homer's problem by telling him that the fishing trip never played a role in her leaving.

In an alternative retconned story introduced in "Mothers and Other Strangers", Homer discovered Mona's whereabouts in Utah when he was a teenager and went with Grampa to track her down, while unknowingly being tailed by FBI agents. The agents pursued Homer, Grampa and Mona to a canyon where Grampa got stuck in a small gap. Forced to choose between both his parents, Homer went back to save Grampa, while Mona managed to flee on a bus to San Francisco. In the present, Grampa and Homer lament to a therapist how they were never able to find Mona again, but Homer does reveal to his family that Mona secretly visited him in the hospital when Bart was born, disguising herself as a doctor.

Character

Creation

Mona Simpson is first mentioned in season one's "There's No Disgrace Like Home", where Homer recalls his mother telling him that he's a "big disappointment". She later made two brief flashback appearances, the first being season two's "Oh Brother, Where Art Thou?" and the second being season six's "Grampa vs. Sexual Inadequacy", and in both cases she was voiced by Maggie Roswell.

Mona's first major appearance was in the seventh season episode "Mother Simpson". The episode was pitched by Richard Appel, who had been desperately trying to think of a story idea and decided to do something about Homer's mother.

Many of the writers were surprised that an episode about Homer's mother had not previously been produced. The writers used the episode as an opportunity to solve several puzzles about the show, such as where Lisa's intelligence came from.

The character is named after Richard Appel's then wife, the novelist Mona Simpson who is Steve Jobs's biological sister. The inspiration for the character comes from Bernardine Dohrn of the Weather Underground, although the writers acknowledge that several people fit her description. Her crime was intentionally the least violent crime the writers could think of, as she did not harm anyone and was only caught because she came back to help Mr. Burns.

Mona Simpson was drawn in a way so that she has a little bit of Homer in her face, such as the shape of her upper lip and her nose. There were several design changes because the directors were trying to make her an attractive older and younger woman, but still be "Simpson-esque".

Voice

Glenn Close was convinced to voice the character in "Mother Simpson" partially because of James L. Brooks. She was directed in her first performance by Josh Weinstein. When Mona gets in the van, her voice is done by Pamela Hayden because Glenn Close could not say "d'oh!" properly and thus they used the original temp track recorded by Hayden.

Glenn Close recorded original material for three other episodes: season 15's "My Mother the Carjacker" and season 19's "Mona Leaves-a". A deleted scene featuring Mona from "Mother Simpson" appears in season seven's "The Simpsons 138th Episode Spectacular" as well as season thirty-one's "Todd, Todd, Why Hast Thou Forsaken Me?". The character also has a speaking appearance in season ten's "D'oh-in in the Wind", this time voiced by Tress MacNeille.

Reception
Glenn Close has been well received as the voice of Mona. IGN ranked Close as the 25th best guest star in the show's history for her first two performances as Mona. In 2007, Entertainment Weekly called Close one of "fourteen guest stars whose standout performances on TV make us wish they'd turn up in a Simpsons Movie 2". In 2008, Entertainment Weekly also named Close one of the 16 best Simpsons guest stars. The Phoenix.com placed Close in the second position on their list of the best 20 Simpsons guest stars. Star News Online listed Close as one of the four hundred reasons why they love The Simpsons. Close appeared on AOL's list of their favorite 25 Simpsons guest stars. Robert Canning of IGN wrote that Close "gave us the sweet voice of Mona Simpson. She's a perfect fit, able to convey a loving, motherly tone, while still convincing the audience she's a headstrong hippie activist."

"Mother Simpson" is one of Bill Oakley and Josh Weinstein's favorite episodes as a perfect combination of real emotion, good jokes and an interesting story and they have expressed regret about not submitting it for the Emmy Award in the Outstanding Animated Program (For Programming less than One Hour) category. "My Mother the Carjacker" received a Writers Guild of America Award nomination in 2004 in the animation category. "Mona Leaves-a" received mixed reviews from critics. Robert Canning described it as "clunky and forced and wasn't all that funny" but still gave it a 7/10. Richard Keller called it a decent episode, but despised Mona's brief appearance.

References

External links

The Simpsons characters
Television characters introduced in 1991
Animated characters introduced in 1991
Fictional activists
Fictional criminals
Animated human characters
Fictional Democrats (United States)
Female characters in animated series
American female characters in television
Hippie movement
Fictional characters incorrectly presumed dead